Euryestola morotinga is a species of beetle in the family Cerambycidae. It was described by Galileo and Martins in 1997. It is endemic to Brazil.

References

Calliini
Beetles described in 1997